Bobbie Jo and the Outlaw is a 1976 crime drama film directed by Mark L. Lester and starring Marjoe Gortner and  Lynda Carter. The film marks the big screen debut of Lynda Carter and was released four months after her first appearance as television's Wonder Woman.

Plot
A young wannabe country singer named Bobbie Jo Baker (Lynda Carter) takes off from her job as a carhop waitress to join with Lyle Wheeler (Marjoe Gortner), a young modern-day Billy The Kid fan. Along the way they recruit Bobbie Jo's sister Pearl Baker (Merrie Lynn Ross) and her boyfriend "Slick" Callahan (Jesse Vint) to join them in their adventures in armed robbery, homicide and mayhem.

Cast
 Marjoe Gortner as Lyle Wheeler 
 Lynda Carter as Bobbie Jo Baker 
 Jesse Vint as 'Slick' Callahan 
 Merrie Lynn Ross as Pearl Baker 
 Gerrit Graham as Ray 'Magic Ray'
 Belinda Balaski as Essie Beaumont 
 Peggy Stewart as Hattie Baker 
 Gene Drew as Sheriff Hicks
 Richard Breeding as Deputy Leroy
 John Durren as Deputy Gance
 Chuck Russell as Deputy
 Virgil Frye as Joe Grant
 Howard R. Kirk as Mr. Potts
 Aly Yoder as Mrs. Potts
 Jesse Price as Buford, The Grocery Clerk
 James Gammon as Leather Salesman
 Jose Toledo as Old Indian

Production
The film was originally to be called "Desperado" another working title was "Bobbi Jo and the Outlaw Man”. The film was shot in New Mexico.

Home media
The film was released on DVD on April 18, 2011 and on Blu-ray on December 8, 2015.

References

External links
 
 
 

1976 films
Films shot in New Mexico
Films directed by Mark L. Lester
1976 crime drama films
American crime drama films
Films about singers
Films scored by Barry De Vorzon
American International Pictures films
1970s English-language films
1970s American films